The Bagamoyo Arts and Cultural Institute  (Taasisi ya Sanaa na Utamaduni Bagamoyo, TaSUBa) is a semi-autonomous governmental organisation in Bagamoyo, Tanzania, for training, research and consultancy services in arts and culture. It was established by The United Republic of Tanzania to "encourage the development of Tanzanian arts and Culture, to promote their use as a record of contemporary life and manners, to promote education about film, television and the moving image generally, and their impact on society".

History and current activities

TaSUBa was established in accordance with the Executive Agencies Act No. 30 of 1997 and Government Notice No. 220 of November 2007. The institute replaced the former Bagamoyo College of Arts, established in 1981, in order to correspond better to the changing role of performing arts of Tanzania. 

According to Ndesumbuka Merinyo, contributor to the book “Art in Eastern Africa”, "students from different parts of Tanzania and abroad meet and receive training in various fields and genres of arts. Here the youth study fine arts, modeling, sculpture, braiding, traditional and modern music, modern dances and traditional dances from the tribes of Tanzania. They also learn stage arts and techniques, costumes and fashion design." 

Furthermore, the institute organizes the yearly Bagamoyo International Arts Festival, which gives opportunity for performances for diverse audiences, for example schoolchildren, and promotes live interactions with other African or international artists. 

Prominent former artists and teachers of the institute were musician Hukwe Zawose, as well as actors and dancers John Mponda and Nkwabi Ng'hangasamala, the father of popular Tanzanian singer Nshoma.

References

Further reading 

 Marion I. Arnold, Art in Eastern Africa, Daressalam, Mkuki Na Nyota Publishers, 2008, 202 pages
Makoye, Herbert F. “Dance Research in Tanzania.” Dance Research Journal, vol. 30, no. 1, 1998, pp. 95–97. JSTOR, www.jstor.org/stable/1477907. Accessed 8 Feb. 2021.

Organizations established in 2007
Government of Tanzania
Tanzanian culture